Réal Gauvin (born March 30, 1935) is a Quebec politician, who served as the member for Montmagny-L'Islet in the Quebec National Assembly as a member of the Quebec Liberal Party from 1985 until 2003.

Biography
Gauvin was manager of a lumber and sawmill company, and was a logger in the family business. He became the owner of R.-A. Gauvin Transport, a company specializing in the transportation of timber. He is also the owner of a pilot license.

Political career

From 1975 until 1985, Gauvin was the Mayor of Saint-Adalbert, Quebec. He ran in the 1985 Quebec provincial election for the seat of Montmagny-L'Islet against incumbent Jacques Leblanc and won by nearly 25 points.

He was re-elected in 1989, 1994 and 1998, never facing a serious challenge. He served as a Deputy Government Whip and Parliamentary Secretary in the Daniel Johnson Jr. government. He subsequently did not seek re-election in 2003.

Electoral record

Provincial

|-

|Liberal
|Réal Gauvin
|align="right"|11,047
|align="right"|45.99
|align="right"|+1.63

|}

|-

|Liberal
|Réal Gauvin
|align="right"|10,339
|align="right"|44.36
|align="right"|-13.39

|-

|Independent
|Jean-Claude Roy
|align="right"|2,605
|align="right"|11.18
|align="right"|-
|-

|New Democrat
|Gaston Bourget
|align="right"|881
|align="right"|3.78
|align="right"|-
|}

|-

|Liberal
|Réal Gauvin
|align="right"|12,688
|align="right"|57.75
|align="right"|-2.77

|-

|}

|-

|Liberal
|Réal Gauvin
|align="right"|14,492
|align="right"|60.52
|align="right"|+15.92

|-

|New Democrat
|Louise Saint-Pierre
|align="right"|564
|align="right"|2.35
|align="right"|-
|-

|Independent
|Antonio Cicchetti
|align="right"|500
|align="right"|2.09
|align="right"|-
|-

|Parti indépendantiste
|Alain Raby
|align="right"|199
|align="right"|0.83
|align="right"|-
|-

|Christian socialist
|Réjean Tardif
|align="right"|47
|align="right"|0.20
|align="right"|-
|}

References 

1935 births
Living people
Canadian aviators
Canadian loggers
Mayors of places in Quebec
Quebec Liberal Party MNAs
People from Chaudière-Appalaches
20th-century Canadian politicians
21st-century Canadian politicians